Niecy is an album by American singer Deniece Williams which was released in 1982 on ARC/Columbia Records. The album reached No. 5 on the Top Soul Albums chart and No. 20 on the Billboard 200.

Critical reception

People described the album as "upbeat, soulful and polished." J.D. Considine of Musician wrote "Williams like the Spinners' Philippe Wynne has the uncanny ability to pull the most out of a tune while maintaining a distinctive vocal personality. Philly Soul lives".

Singles
A cover of The Royalettes' "It's Gonna Take a Miracle" was released as a single. The song peaked at No. 1 on the Billboard Hot R&B Songs chart, No. 6 on the Billboard  Adult Contemporary Singles chart and No. 10 on the Billboard Hot 100 chart.

Track listing

Original release

Personnel

Musicians 
 Bob Babbitt – bass guitar, Piccolo bass
 Thom Bell – keyboards, backing vocals, arrangements, conductor
 Charles Collins – drums
 Bobby Eli – guitar
 Joseph B. Jefferson – backing vocals
 George Merrill – synthesizer, backing vocals
 Bill Neale – guitar, strings (4) 
 Don Renaldo – strings, horns
 Ed Shea – percussion
 Larry Washington – percussion
 Deniece Williams – lead vocals

Technical 
 Producers – Thom Bell and Deniece Williams
 Production Coordinatior – Bill Neale
 Engineer – Joe Tarsia
 Second Engineers – Dirk Devlen and Michael Tarsia
 Mastered by Mike Reese at The Mastering Lab (Los Angeles, CA).
 Design – Nancy Donald 
 Photography – Allan Luftig

Charts

Weekly charts

Year-end charts

Singles

References 

Deniece Williams albums
1982 albums
Columbia Records albums
ARC Records albums
Albums produced by Thom Bell
Albums recorded at Sigma Sound Studios